Horseed Stadium is a multi-purpose stadium in Horseed, Somalia.  It is currently used mostly for football matches and is the home ground of Somalia League team Horseed FC.

The stadium currently holds 10,000 spectators.

External links
Calciozz

References

Football venues in Somalia